The Sakhir Formula 2 round is a FIA Formula 2 Championship series race that is run on the Bahrain International Circuit track in Sakhir, Bahrain.

Winners

See also
 Sakhir Grand Prix
 Bahrain GP2 round

Notes

Sakhir
Formula 2
Formula 2